Peter Albert Loeb (born July 3, 1937) is a mathematician at the University of Illinois at Urbana–Champaign. He co-authored a basic reference text on nonstandard analysis (Hurd–Loeb 1985).  Reviewer Perry Smith for MathSciNet wrote:
This book is a welcome addition to the literature on nonstandard analysis.
The notion of Loeb measure named after him has become a standard tool in the field.

In 2012 he became a fellow of the American Mathematical Society.

See also
Influence of nonstandard analysis

Notes

Publications
Hurd, Albert E.; Loeb, Peter A. An introduction to nonstandard real analysis. Pure and Applied Mathematics, 118. Academic Press, Inc., Orlando, FL, 1985. 
Loeb, Peter A. "Conversion from nonstandard to standard measure spaces and applications in probability theory". Trans. Amer. Math. Soc. 211 (1975), 113–122.
Loeb, Peter A. "A new proof of the Tychonoff theorem". American Mathematical Monthly 72 1965 711–717.
Bliedtner, J.; Loeb, P. "A reduction technique for limit theorems in analysis and probability theory". Ark. Mat. 30 (1992), no. 1, 25–43.
Loeb, Peter A. "Weak limits of measures and the standard part map". Proceedings of the American Mathematical Society 77 (1979), no. 1, 128–135.
Füredi, Zoltán; Loeb, Peter A. "On the best constant for the Besicovitch covering theorem". Proc. Amer. Math. Soc. 121 (1994), no. 4, 1063–1073.
Loeb, Peter A. "A nonstandard functional approach to Fubini's theorem". Proc. Amer. Math. Soc. 93 (1985), no. 2, 343–346.
Loeb, Peter; Sun, Yeneng: "Purification of measure-valued maps". Illinois Journal of Mathematics 50 (2006), no. 1-4, 747–762.
Loeb, Peter A.; Osswald, Horst "Nonstandard integration theory in topological vector lattices". Monatsch. Math. 124 (1997), no. 1, 53–82.
Loeb, Peter A. "An axiomatic treatment of pairs of elliptic differential equations". Annales de l'Institut Fourier (Grenoble) 16 1966 fasc. 2, 167–208.

External links
Peter Loeb, University of Illinois at Urbana-Champaign

Mathematical logicians
Living people
University of Illinois Urbana-Champaign faculty
Fellows of the American Mathematical Society
1937 births
People from Berkeley, California